The Kyle of Lochalsh line is a primarily single-track railway line in the Scottish Highlands, from  to . Many of the passengers are tourists, but there are also locals visiting Inverness for shopping, and commuters. In the past there were some through services to and from Glasgow, Edinburgh or Aberdeen. None of the line is electrified, and all trains on the line are diesel-powered, as are all other trains in the Scottish Highlands.

Route
The Kyle of Lochalsh line runs east-west and links the town of Dingwall, on the east coast of the Highlands at the tip of the Cromarty Firth, with the village of Kyle of Lochalsh on the west coast, close to the Isle of Skye. The line lies entirely within the former county of Ross and Cromarty, part of the modern-day Highland council area.

Dingwall–Achnasheen: Easter Ross

Almost immediately north of Dingwall, the two lines diverge at Dingwall Junction and the line to Kyle of Lochalsh takes a sharp left turn to head west.

Initially, the single-track line briefly follows the course of the A834 road until it abruptly curves off to the north, crossing over the River Peffery, only to turn west again. There used to be a short branch line here that went straight on towards ; this branch closed to passengers in 1946 and closed completely in 1951. Achterneed is one of only three stations on the main line to have been closed, and one of two that were never reopened.

The line then continues west, climbing at gradients as steep as 1 in 50, until it passes close to the summit of Raven Rock where it starts descending. It eventually meets the Black Water – a tributary of the River Conon – and follows it upstream alongside the A832 road. The railway and the road both skirt the southern edge of Loch Garve and then turn northwest, approaching the first open station on the line – . This was supposed to be site of a junction with the Garve and Ullapool Railway to the port village of Ullapool but, despite securing government approval, this line was never built.

Beyond Garve, the railway and the A832 continue westwards, away from the Black Water whose source lies to the north. Soon, the line meets Loch Luichart – the source of the River Conon itself – and follows its northern edge; Lochluichart station is located at the northwestern tip of the loch. This station was moved to this location from its original site in 1954 as a result of a hydroelectric scheme, which raised the water level of the loch. From here, the line continues to follow several of the Conon's tributaries, passing by Loch a' Chuilinn and Loch Achanalt until it reaches Achanalt station near the mouth of the River Bran. The track then follows the course of this river for about  until the village of Achnasheen, near the eastern end of Loch a' Chroisg. The station at Achnasheen, like Garve, was to be the site of a junction: the proposed Loch Maree and Aultbea Railway was to run between Achnasheen and the small fishing village of Aultbea, but the line never received government approval.

Down the line from Achnasheen the line turns southwest, parting ways with the A832 which continues westwards; the railway now parallels the A890 road instead.

Achnasheen–Kyle of Lochalsh: Wester Ross

A few miles southwest of Achnasheen the track reaches its highest point above sea level, as it leaves the drainage basin of the River Conon (which flows to the Cromarty Firth on the east coast) and enters the basin of the River Carron (whose estuary is on the west coast). The line meets the River Carron itself at Loch Scaven near its source, and then follows the course of the river downstream.

Close to the point where the Carron is joined by the Alltan na Feola stream lies the site of the former Glencarron station; this small halt closed in 1964, although some drivers continued to stop at the station unofficially, refusing to acknowledge the station's closure, until as late as the 1990s. The line then skirts the nortwestern edge of Loch Dùghaill and continues to follow the River Carron until reaching Strathcarron station, where the river ends as it flows into Loch Carron, a sea inlet. From here, the railway runs along the southern coastline of Loch Carron, and continues to hug the coast all the way until the terminus at Kyle of Lochalsh (except briefly near Plockton).

A short distance from Strathcarron the line reaches another station, located near the mouth of the river of the same name. The line then continues for nearly  until it reaches Stromeferry station, adjacent to a former ferry port which linked the area with North Strome on the opposite side of the loch. Occasionally the ferry link reopens on a temporary basis, when the A890 is closed due to landslips. At Stromeferry the A890 turns south; from here, the railway does not parallel any major roads, instead simply following the coast.

Similarly to Glencarron, the station closed in 1965 but continued to be served unofficially, as drivers refused to acknowledge the station's closure; however, unlike Glencarron, Duncraig eventually reopened officially, in 1976.

From here, the line runs in a generally southerly direction, although the exact heading varies significantly as the track closely follows the jagged coast.

Infrastructure

The entire line is unelectrified.

The whole line, together with the Far North Line, is signalled using the Radio Electronic Token Block system, which is very cost-effective in both implementation and maintenance, but significantly limits the capacity of the lines.

Along the route there are 29 bridges, 31 cuttings, and a single tunnel.

History 
Dingwall station itself had been open since 1862, as an intermediate station on the Inverness and Ross-shire Railway (part of the modern-day Far North Line).

The Strathpeffer Branch operated between 1885 and 1951.

In 1933, the London, Midland and Scottish Railway introduced two named trains on the line, The Hebridean and The Lewisman.

In July 1939 a landslide between Attadale and Stomeferry derailed an engine and six freight vans. The landslide was caused by recent heavy rains.

In 1949 it was planned to relocate Lochluichart station to allow the flooding of the area by the Glascarnoch-Luichart-Torr Achilty hydroelectric scheme. On 3 May 1954 a new station was opened as Lochluichart.

In the 1960s the line was listed to be closed under the Reshaping of British Railways report; however it was reprieved and services continued.

In 1970, British Rail wanted to close the line when Ross and Cromarty council voted to create a new £460,000 ferry terminal at Ullapool ( from Stornoway) replacing that at Kyle of Lochalsh ( from Stornoway). In December 1971 it was reported that the costs of operating the line were £318,000 per annum, with revenue of £51,000 per annum, and the Secretary of State for Transport agreed that the line should close, but a spirited local campaign again succeeded in reversing this decision and keeping it open.

The line reopened in May 1990.

Services

On Sundays there is just one train per day each way, increasing to two per day during the summer months. ScotRail operates all services on the line with its Class 158/7 "Express Sprinter" diesel multiple units.

If there are no passengers wishing to get on or off the train at a request stop, it will pass through without stopping.

Services between Inverness and Kyle of Lochalsh typically have a journey time of about 2 hours 40 minutes end-to-end.

Passenger volumes

Stations between Inverness and Dingwall are also included for reference, as all trains on the line also call there
Stations in italics are request stops
The statistics cover twelve-month periods that start in April

Future
In the Scottish Government's National Transport Strategy, published in February 2020, it was stated that the line would not be electrified with overhead lines, but rather, an alternative to diesel traction will be used for the route.

Kyle of Lochalsh line in film and books

The Kyle of Lochalsh line was featured in Eddie McConnell's lyrical documentary The Line to Skye (1973) with commentary by Scottish writer William McIlvanney, commissioned as part of Ross & Cromarty's campaign to keep the line open at a time when it was threatened with closure.  The film follows the train  from Inverness to Kyle of Lochalsh, describing the communities, landscape and wildlife along its route, while contrasting the frustration of motorists with the relaxation of the journey by rail.

In Stephen Durrell's 1939 documentary West of Inverness, the importance of the Kyle of Lochalsh line to the crofters of the West Highlands is demonstrated through its role of transporting passengers, mail, parcels, food and livestock to and from their communities.  The film shows the LMS steam locomotives that operated the line at this time.

In the episode of Great Railway Journeys of the World "Confessions of a Trainspotter" (1980), Michael Palin travels from London to the Kyle of Lochalsh and returns with the railway station's sign.

Video 125 Ltd. produced a driver's eye view documentary of the line in 1987, when the service was still operated using loco-hauled trains, in this case motive power being provided by Class 37 no. 37262 named Dounreay after the nuclear power station. Narration was by Paul Coia.

Nicholas Whittaker travelled the line both ways during the summer of 1973, an experience he wrote about in his 1995 book Platform Souls.

As with the other railway lines of the western Highlands (the West Highland Railway and the Callander and Oban Railway), John Thomas wrote a comprehensive and highly readable history, The Skye Railway.

Notes

References

Further reading

External links 

RailScot - Dingwall and Skye Railway
RailScot - Kyle of Lochalsh Extension Railway
RailScot - Strathpeffer Branch
Route on OpenStreetMap (Dingwall–Kyle of Lochalsh)
Timetable World - Historical timetables for this line
Kyle of Lochalsh Station in 2018
Views of the stations in 1970

Transport in Highland (council area)
Railway lines in Scotland
Standard gauge railways in Scotland